Thomas John Tellmann (born March 29, 1954) is an American former professional baseball pitcher. He played in Major League Baseball (MLB) for the San Diego Padres from 1979 to 1980, the Milwaukee Brewers from 1983 to 1984, and the Oakland Athletics in 1985.

In 227 innings pitched over 112 appearances, Tellmann accepted 65 total chances (15 putouts, 50 assists) without an error for a perfect 1.000 fielding percentage in his major league career.

External links

1954 births
Living people
Major League Baseball pitchers
San Diego Padres players
Milwaukee Brewers players
Oakland Athletics players
Hawaii Islanders players
Baseball players from Pennsylvania
UNLV Rebels baseball players
Grand Canyon Antelopes baseball players
People from Warren, Pennsylvania